This is a list of Hebrew-language authors:

A

Shimon Adaf 
Tamar Adar 
Uri Adelman 
Shimon Agassi
Shmuel Yosef Agnon (winner of the Nobel prize for literature in 1966)  
Lea Aini 
Miriam Akavia
Sholem Aleichem 
Gila Almagor 
Nisim Aloni
Shulamit Aloni
Udi Aloni 
Nathan Alterman 
Mor Altshuler
Yehuda Amichai 
Aharon Amir 
Eli Amir 
Aharon Appelfeld 
Naim Araidi 
Dan Armon
David Avidan 
Yemima Avidar-Tchernovitz 
Yossi Avni-Levy 
Shay K. Azoulay

B

Amos Bar  
Nir Baram
Hanoch Bartov 
Yocheved Bat-Miriam 
Haim Be`er
Maya Bejerano 
Menahem Ben 
Dahn Ben-Amotz
Netiva Ben-Yehuda 
Avraham Ben-Yitzhak 
Reuven Ben-Yosef 
Micha Josef Berdyczewski
Isaac Dov Berkowitz 
Haim Nachman Bialik 
Erez Biton
Yaakov Blau
Rachel Bluwstein
Shani Boianjiu
Reuben Asher Braudes
Yosef Haim Brenner 
Martin Buber
Oded Burla 
Yehuda Burla

C

T. Carmi 
Orly Castel-Bloom
Rahel Chalfi 
Sami Shalom Chetrit

D
Yael Dayan
Yehiel De-Nur (1909-2001)
Yehiel Dinur 
Ramy Ditzanny

E

Dov Elbaum 
Emuna Elon
Alex Epstein

F
Jacob Fichman
Alona Frankel

G

Naomi Gal
Assaf Gavron
Yehonatan Geffen 
Shira Geffen
Mordechai Geldman 
Zerubavel Gilad
Amir Gilboa
Asher Hirsch Ginsberg (Ahad Haam)
Uri Nissan Gnessin
Leah Goldberg 
Judah Leib Gordon
Carine Goren
Haim Gouri
Michal Govrin
Uri Zvi Greenberg (Tur Malka)
David Grossman 
Batya Gur

H

Shimon Halkin 
Avigdor Hameiri 
Shulamith Hareven
Shmuel Hasfari
Haim Hazaz
Meshullam Feivush Heller
Shlomo Herberg
Dalia Hertz 
Amira Hess 
Ayin Hillel 
Yoel Hoffmann 
Shifra Horn 
Daniel Horowitz
Yair Hurvitz

I
Naphtali Herz Imber
Solomon Ibn Gabirol

J
Amnon Jacont

K

Aharon Avraham Kabak
Yehudit Kafri 
Amalia Kahana-Carmon 
Yoram Kaniuk 
Sayed Kashua
Shmuel Katz
Itzhak Katzenelson 
Amos Kenan 
Yehoshua Kenaz 
Rivka Keren 
Etgar Keret 
Alona Kimhi 
Levin Kipnis
Arthur Koestler (most of work not in Hebrew, but wrote some articles in language)
Ephraim Kishon 
Admiel Kosman 
Abba Kovner 
Asher Kravitz
Zundel Kroizer

L

Tsruya Lahav 
Yitzhak Lamdan 
Yitzhak Laor
Shulamit Lapid 
Yair Lapid
Micah Joseph Lebensohn 
Haim Lensky 
Motti Lerner
Ron Leshem 
Hezi Leskali
Hanoch Levin
Zvi Lieberman
Savyon Liebrecht
Irit Linur

M

Abraham Mapu 
Aharon Megged 
Sami Michael 
Agi Mishol
Mendele Mocher Sefarim
Igal Mossinsohn 
Josef Mundy

N
Tamar Fish Nachshon
Yair Nehorai 
Eshkol Nevo

O

Aliza Olmert 
Dvora Omer 
Joachim Oppenheim
Amir Or 
Ram Oren
Uri Orlev 
Yitzhak Orpaz-Auerbach 
Amos Oz 
Kobi Oz

P

Dan Pagis
Alexander Penn 
Isaac Loeb Peretz
Israel Pinkas (Anton)
Elisha Porat 
Gabriel Preil

R

Esther Raab
Dorit Rabinyan
Rachel  
Naomi Ragen
Yonatan Ratosh 
Dahlia Ravikovitch
Janice Rebibo
Abraham Regelson
Galila Ron-Feder Amit 
Roee Rosen 
Miriam Roth 
Yechezkel Roth
Tuvya Ruebner

S

Rami Saari
Pinhas Sadeh
Yossi Sarid 
David Schutz 
Nava Semel
Aharon Shabtai 
Yaakov Shabtai 
Nathan Shaham
Gershon Shaked
Meir Shalev 
Zeruya Shalev
Yitzhaq Shami 
Moshe Shamir 
Anton Shammas 
Amnon Shamosh
Chava Shapiro
Avner Shats
Ofer Shelach
Tzur Shezaf
David Shimoni
Avraham Shlonsky
Eliezer Smoli 
Zalman Shneur
Gershon Shufman
Ephraim Sidon
Moshe Smilansky
Peretz Smolenskin 
Eliezer Smoli 
Michal Snunit 
Yehoshua Sobol 
Ronny Someck 
Aharon Sorasky
Jacob Steinberg
Eliezer Steinman
Alexander Süsskind of Grodno

T

Benjamin Tammuz
Gadi Taub
Shaul Tchernichovsky
Avner Treinin
Dan Tsalka
Hayyim Tyrer
Uri Tzaig

V
David Vogel

W
Yona Wallach
Meir Wieseltier

Y

Dov Yaffe
Zvi Yair
Miriam Yalan-Shteklis
Abraham B. Yehoshua 
Avoth Yeshurun 
S. Yizhar 
Natan Yonatan

Z
Natan Zach 
Nurit Zarchi 
Zelda 
Benny Ziffer

See also
List of Hebrew-language playwrights
List of Hebrew-language poets
Culture of Israel
:Category:Hebrew-language playwrights
:Category:Hebrew-language poets
:Category:Hebrew-language writers

External links
 Author biographies at the Institute for the Translation of Hebrew Literature

Lists of writers by language